East Butler is a borough in Butler County, Pennsylvania, United States. The population was 732 at the 2010 census.

Geography
East Butler is located east of the center of Butler County at  (40.877703, -79.843921), in the valley of Bonnie Brook, a tributary of Connoquenessing Creek.

Demographics

As of the census of 2000, there were 679 people, 295 households, and 184 families residing in the borough. The population density was 650.4 people per square mile (252.1/km2). There were 302 housing units at an average density of 289.3 per square mile (112.1/km2). The racial makeup of the borough was 99.71% White, 0.15% Asian, and 0.15% Pacific Islander. Hispanic or Latino of any race were 0.15% of the population.

There were 295 households, out of which 26.8% had children under the age of 18 living with them, 53.2% were married couples living together, 6.8% had a female householder with no husband present, and 37.6% were non-families. 33.2% of all households were made up of individuals, and 14.2% had someone living alone who was 65 years of age or older. The average household size was 2.30 and the average family size was 2.97.

In the borough the population was spread out, with 20.9% under the age of 18, 8.0% from 18 to 24, 29.2% from 25 to 44, 24.9% from 45 to 64, and 17.1% who were 65 years of age or older. The median age was 40 years. For every 100 females there were 98.0 males. For every 100 females age 18 and over, there were 92.5 males.

The median income for a household in the borough was $34,821, and the median income for a family was $41,375. Males had a median income of $32,917 versus $24,375 for females. The per capita income for the borough was $20,242. About 6.2% of families and 8.4% of the population were below the poverty line, including 10.6% of those under age 18 and 1.6% of those age 65 or over.

References

Populated places established in 1927
Boroughs in Butler County, Pennsylvania